Miss Dominican Republic 1988 was held on October 12, 1987. There were 18 candidates who competed for the national crown. The winner represented the Dominican Republic at the Miss Universe 1988. The first runner-up entered in Miss World 1988. The second runner-up entered Reinado Internacional del Café 1988. The rest of the finalists entered different pageants.

Results

Delegates

External links
 https://web.archive.org/web/20090211102742/http://ogm.elcaribe.com.do/ogm/consulta.aspx

Miss Dominican Republic
1988 beauty pageants
1988 in the Dominican Republic